Karen Gershon, born Kaethe Loewenthal (29 August 1923 – 24 March 1993) was a German-born British writer and poet. She escaped to Britain in December 1938.

Her book We came as Children: A Collective Autobiography uses a number of testimonies of kindertransport to construct a single account.

One of her best-known poems, I was not there, describes her feelings of guilt at not being there when her parents were murdered by the Nazis.

Works

UK

Poetry
 THE RELENTLESS YEAR New Poets 1959, Eyre & Spottiswoode 1960
 SELECTED POEMS Gollancz 1966
 LEGACIES AND ENCOUNTERS Gollancz 1972
 MY DAUGHTERS, MY SISTERS Gollancz 1975
 COMING BACK FROM BABYLON Gollancz 1979
 COLLECTED POEMS Macmillan, Papermac 1990
 GRACE NOTES (with drawings by Stella Tripp), Happy Dragons Press, 2002

Non-Fiction
 WE CAME AS CHILDREN London, Gollancz 1966, republished Macmillan, Papermac 1989
 POSTSCRIPT: A Collective Account of the Lives of Jews in West Germany Since the Second World War  Gollancz 1969
 A LESSER CHILD (Autobiography, Vol.1) Peter Owen 1993

Fiction
 BURN HELEN Harvester Press 1980
 THE BREAD OF EXILE Gollancz 1985
 THE FIFTH GENERATION Gollancz 1987

U.S.A.
 WE CAME AS CHILDREN Harcourt Brace & World 1967
 SELECTED POEMS Harcourt Brace & World 1967
 A TEMPERED WIND (Autobiography, Vol.2, 1938–1943) Northwestern University Press 2009
Germany
 WIR KAMEN ALS KINDER Alibaba Verlag 1988
 DIE FÜNFTE GENERATION Alibaba Verlag 1988
 DAS UNTERKIND  Rowohlt 1992
 MICH NUR ZU TRÖSTEN BESTIMMT Karin Fischer, Edition Roter Stein 2000

Sources
 Peter Lawson (2006): Anglo-Jewish Poetry from Isaac Rosenberg to Elaine Feinstein. Pub. Vallentine Mitchell.
 J. M. Ritchie, German-speaking Exiles in Great Britain, Rodopi, Amsterdam, 2001, .
 Literary estate of Karen Gershon (see External Links).

References

External links
 Shmuel Huppert, Biography of Karen Gershon, Jewish Women's Archive
 Meinolf Schumacher, Bielefelder Literatur-Splitter (12): "Wilhelm Harms' House" (Karen Gershon)
 Website of Stella Tripp, daughter of Karen Gershon, executor of literary estate of Karen Gershon
 Website of Naomi Shmuel, daughter of Karen Gershon, site contains further information about Karen Gershon
 Poems by Karen Gershon, 16 poems read by the author (with text)

1923 births
1993 deaths
British women poets
Jewish emigrants from Nazi Germany to the United Kingdom
Jewish poets
British Jewish writers
Kindertransport refugees
20th-century British women writers
20th-century British poets
Jewish women writers